Maria Luisa Vicuña was the Salvadoran contestant to the Miss World 2012 in Ordos City, China.

Biography
Born in the Sonsonate, El Salvador, Vicuña is the youngest of 3 children. Her parents were Colombian civil engineers who came to El Salvador to work on the “El Puente de Oro” (The Golden Bridge) that connected the rest of the country to the east. Vicuña was a model before becoming Nuestra Belleza Mundo 2012. She then competed in the Miss World 2012, but did not place among the semifinals.

After participating in Miss World and Miss Continente Americano, Vicuña became host to a new program in TCS called Sabaton, where she currently works for.

References 

Nuestra Belleza El Salvador
Salvadoran beauty pageant winners
Miss World 2012 delegates
Living people
Year of birth missing (living people)
21st-century Salvadoran women